Marianne Alphant (born 1945 in Paris) is a French writer and literary critic.

A graduate from the École normale supérieure de jeunes filles in 1964 and agrégée de philosophie, Marianne Alphant worked for the daily Libération from 1983 to 1992. She directed the "Revues parlées" of the Centre Georges Pompidou from 1993 to 2010.

Works 
 1975: Grandes « O », Éditions Gallimard
 1978: Le Ciel à Bezons, Gallimard.
 1983: L’Histoire enterrée, 
 1993: Monet : une vie dans le paysage, Hazan.
 1994: Claude Monet en Norvège, Hazan.
 1998: Pascal : tombeau pour un ordre, Hachette Littératures.
 2001: Explications. Interviews with Pierre Guyotat, éditions Léo Scheer.
 2007: Petite nuit, P.O.L.
 2010: Claude Monet. Cathédrale(s) de Rouen, éditions Point de vues.
 2013: Ces choses-là P.O.L.

External links 
 Marianne Alphant on France Culture
 Marianne Alphant, publications on CAIRN
 Claude Monet. Une vie dans le paysage on Hazan
 Marianne Alphant Ces choses-là on YouTube
 Heureux petits riens on Le Monde (14 February 2013)

20th-century French women writers
20th-century French non-fiction writers
21st-century French non-fiction writers
21st-century French women writers
French women critics
French literary critics
Women literary critics
Commandeurs of the Ordre des Arts et des Lettres
Writers from Paris
1945 births
Living people